{{Infobox song
| name       = One More Shot
| cover      =
| alt        =
| type       = single
| artist     = The Rolling Stones
| album      = GRRR!
| released   = {{unbulleted list|8 November 2012 {{small|(on GRRR!)}}|1 January 2013 }}
| recorded   = 21 and 23 August 2012
| studio     = Guillaume Tell Studios (Paris, France)
| genre      = Hard rock, blues rock
| length     = 3:05
| label      = Universal Music
| writer     = Mick Jagger, Keith Richards, Steve Jordan
| producer   = Don Was, The Glimmer Twins, Jeff Bhasker, Emile Haynie (co.)
| prev_title = Doom and Gloom
| prev_year  = 2012
| next_title = Just Your Fool
| next_year  = 2016
}}

"One More Shot" is the second single taken from GRRR!, the 50th anniversary compilation album by the Rolling Stones. It was premiered on BBC Radio 6 Music on 8 November 2012. The song marks the first time that Mick Jagger, Keith Richards, Charlie Watts and Ronnie Wood had been in the studio together for seven years, since the recording of their last album, A Bigger Bang. An official audio video was released on YouTube the same day. On 9 January 2013, "One More Shot" was released as a single on iTunes packaged with a remix of the song done by Jeff Bhasker.

The song charted at No. 74 on the UK Airplay Chart, No. 13 on the Billboard Heritage Rock in 2013.

 Composition 

 Personnel 
 Mick Jagger — vocals, percussion, production
 Keith Richards — rhythm guitar, backing vocals, production
 Ronnie Wood — lead guitar
 Charlie Watts — drumsAdditional musicians'''
 Darryl Jones — bass guitar
 Chuck Leavell — keyboards

 Charts 
Chart entries below are according to GRRR!''.

References

Notes

External links 
 Music video
 

2013 singles
The Rolling Stones songs

Song recordings produced by Jagger–Richards
Songs written by Jagger–Richards

2012 songs
Universal Music Group singles